The Damoh–Kota Passenger is a daily passenger train service offered by West Central Railway. It runs between Damoh Junction railway station of Damoh City, Madhya Pradesh and Kota Junction Railway Station in Rajasthan, India.

Arrival and departure
 Train 1736 starts from Damoh at 17:00 hrs, reaching Kota the next day at 02:00 hrs.
 Train 1735 departs from Kota Jn. at 04:00 hrs, reaching Damoh at 22:00 hrs.

Route and stops
The train goes via. Bina–Katni rail route halting at almost all the major and minor stoppage. The major stops are:
 DAMOH
 Patharia
 Saugor Makronia
 Saugor
 Khurai
 Bina Junction (Madhya Pradesh)
 Ashoknagar
 Mungaoli
 Guna
 Ruthiyai
 KOTA JN.

Coach composition
The train generally consist a total of 12 coaches including:
 8 general coaches
 3 sleeper coaches
 1 chair car
It does not have a first-class compartment or pantry car.

Average speed and frequency
The train runs with an average speed of 35 km/h.

Trivia
 Locally, the train is known as Shuttle (or Suttle) by the people especially from rural areas.
 This is the first passenger train service on Bina–Katni rail route
 It is one of the oldest passenger train in India
 The number allotted for the train changed thrice. First it was 535/536 which changed than to 189/190 and is 1735/1736 at present.
 The train was first introduced between Damoh and Saugor in 1959 which was than introduced and extended till Kota Jn.
 The Kota bound passenger is always overcrowded as compared to Damoh bound passenger

Other trains from Damoh to Kota/Jaipur
 Dayodaya Express
 Durg–Jaipur Express

References
 

Rail transport in Madhya Pradesh
Transport in Kota, Rajasthan
Rail transport in Rajasthan
Slow and fast passenger trains in India